Arnold Neilson Smith (8 June 1889 – 24 July 1957) was a Liberal party member of the House of Commons of Canada. He was born in Cornwall, Ontario and became a shipowner.

Smith attended public and secondary schools at Cornwall. He was president of the Cornwall Board of Trade and of Stuebing Lift Truck Systems Ltd. and became president and manager of Montreal and Cornwall Navigation Company. Smith served as a Life-Governor Cornwall General Hospital and was Deputy Chief Commissioner of the Liquor Control Board of Ontario.

He was first elected to Parliament at the Stormont riding in the 1926 general election. After serving one term, Smith was defeated by Frank Thomas Shaver of the Conservatives in the 1930 federal election.

References

External links
 

1889 births
1957 deaths
Canadian chief executives
Liberal Party of Canada MPs
Members of the House of Commons of Canada from Ontario